Phosphorous acid (or phosphonic acid (singular)) is the compound described by the formula H3PO3. This acid is diprotic (readily ionizes two protons), not triprotic as might be suggested by this formula. Phosphorous acid is an intermediate in the preparation of other phosphorus compounds.  Organic derivatives of phosphorous acid, compounds with the formula RPO3H2, are called phosphonic acids.

Nomenclature and tautomerism

Solid  has tetrahedral geometry about the central phosphorus atom, with a P–H bond of 132 pm, one P=O double bond of 148 pm and two longer P–OH single bonds of 154 pm. In common with other phosphorus oxides with P-H bonds (e.g.hypophosphorous acid and dialkyl phosphites), it exists in equilibrium with an extremely minor tautomer .  IUPAC recommends that the latter be called phosphorous acid, whereas the dihydroxy form is called phosphonic acid.  Only the reduced phosphorus compounds are spelled with an "ous" ending. 

PIII(OH)3  ⇌  HPV(O)(OH)2  K = 1010.3 (25°C, aqueous)

Preparation
On an industrial scale, the acid is prepared by hydrolysis of phosphorus trichloride with water or steam:

HPO(OH)2 could be produced by the hydrolysis of phosphorus trioxide:

Reactions

Acid–base properties
Phosphorous acid has a pKa in the range 1.26–1.3. 
  pKa = 1.3
It is a diprotic acid, the hydrogenphosphite ion, HP(O)2(OH)− is a weak acid:
     pKa = 6.7

The conjugate base HP(O)2(OH)− is called hydrogen phosphite, and the second conjugate base, is the phosphite ion. (Note that the IUPAC recommendations are hydrogen phosphonate and phosphonate respectively).

The hydrogen atom bonded directly to the phosphorus atom is not readily ionizable.

Redox properties
On heating at 200 °C, phosphorous acid disproportionates to phosphoric acid and phosphine: 

This reaction is used for laboratory-scale preparations of PH3.

Phosphorous acid slowly oxidizes in air to phosphoric acid.

Both phosphorous acid and its deprotonated forms are good reducing agents, although not necessarily quick to react. They are oxidized to phosphoric acid or its salts.  It reduces solutions of noble metal cations to the metals.  When phosphorous acid is treated with a cold solution of mercuric chloride, a white precipitate of mercurous chloride forms:
H3PO3 + 2 HgCl2 + H2O → Hg2Cl2 + H3PO4 + 2 HCl
Mercurous chloride is reduced further by phosphorous acid to mercury on heating or on standing:
H3PO3 + Hg2Cl2 + H2O → 2 Hg + H3PO4 + 2 HCl

As a ligand
Upon treatment with metals of d6 configuration, phosphorous acid is known to coordinate as the otherwise rare P(OH)3 tautomer.  Examples include Mo(CO)5(P(OH)3) and [Ru(NH3)4(H2O)(P(OH)3)]2+.

Heating a mixture of potassium tetrachloroplatinate and phosphorous acid gives the luminescent salt potassium diplatinum(II) tetrakispyrophosphite:
2 K2PtCl4  +  8  H3PO3  →  K4[Pt2(HO2POPO2H)4]  +  8 HCl  +  4 H2O

Uses
The most important use of phosphorous acid (phosphonic acid) is the production of basic lead phosphite, which is a stabilizer in PVC and related chlorinated polymers.  

It is used in the production of basic lead phosphonate PVC stabilizer, aminomethylene phosphonic acid and hydroxyethane diphosphonic acid.
It is also used as a strong reducing agent and in the production of phosphorous acid, synthetic fibres, organophosphorus pesticides, and the highly efficient water treatment agent ATMP.

Ferrous materials, including steel, may be somewhat protected by promoting oxidation ("rust") and then converting the oxidation to a metalophosphate by using phosphoric acid and further protected by surface coating. (See: Passivation (chemistry)).

Organic derivatives
The IUPAC (mostly organic) name is phosphonic acid. This nomenclature is commonly reserved for substituted derivatives, that is, organic group bonded to phosphorus, not simply an ester. For example, (CH3)PO(OH)2 is "methylphosphonic acid", which may of course form "methylphosphonate" esters.

References

Further reading

Hydrogen compounds
Phosphorus oxoacids
Phosphonates
Phosphonic acids
Phosphorus(III) compounds